USNS Narragansett (T-ATF-167) was a  of the US Navy.

The ship was laid down on 5 May 1977 by the Marinette Marine Corp. of Marinette, Wisconsin.
Launched on 12 May 1979, and delivered to the Navy on 9 November 1979, Narragansett was assigned to the Military Sealift Command (MSC), and placed in service as USNS Narragansett (T-ATF-167).

She participated in the search for the remains of the downed Korean Air Lines Flight 007 in 1983.

The ship was placed out of service on 18 October 1999, and assigned to the inactive reserve. Struck from the Naval Vessel Register on 5 June 2002, she was transferred to Naval Air Systems Command for service as tow/service vessel on 2 August 2002. Narragansett was leased through Naval Sea Systems Command (Supervisor of Salvage), for commercial service. She is currently managed and crewed by Donjon Marine of Hillside, New Jersey and home ported at Pier 80 in San Francisco, California.

References

 

 

Tugs of the United States Navy
Cold War auxiliary ships of the United States
Ships built by Marinette Marine
1979 ships